Emergency Ward 10 is a British medical soap opera series shown on ITV between 1957 and 1967. Like The Grove Family, a series shown by the BBC between 1954 and 1957, Emergency Ward 10 is considered to be one of British television's first major soap operas.

Overview 
The series was made by the ITV contractor ATV and set in a fictional hospital called Oxbridge General. Growing out of what was originally intended to be no more than a six-week serial (entitled Calling Nurse Roberts), the series became ITV's first twice-weekly evening soap opera. Emergency Ward 10 was the first hospital-based television drama to establish a successful format combining medical matters with storylines centring on the personal lives of the doctors and nurses.

Emergency Ward 10 attracted attention for its portrayal of an interracial relationship between surgeon Louise Mahler (played by Joan Hooley) and Doctor Giles Farmer (played by John White), showing the second kiss on television between black and white actors in July 1964, the first such kiss being in a Granada TV play You in Your Small Corner in 1962. However, the producers wrote the Mahler character out shortly afterwards by sending her to Africa, where she succumbed to snake bite.

When ratings began to slide it was decided to convert the programme from a soap to a one-hour drama for Saturday nights, produced by Jo Douglas. It didn't work.
Emergency Ward 10 ended in 1967 after the show had been on air for ten years. ATV executive Lew Grade later admitted that cancelling the series was one of the biggest mistakes he ever made in his career.

The formula was subsequently revived with the (originally) afternoon series General Hospital (no connection with the American daytime soap General Hospital) which was broadcast between 1972 and 1979.

Australia's Charles "Bud" Tingwell starred in the series as surgeon Alan "Digger" Dawson, enjoying a heart-throb status because of his role.

The closing theme tune was "Silks and Satins" by Peter Yorke.

Releases 
In March 2008, Network released a DVD set containing the 24 earliest surviving episodes which date from 1959 and 1960. A second 24-episode volume was released in July 2008, while a third 24-episode set was released in 2010. A 1966 episode was included on Network's Soap Box Volume One DVD as was the sole-surviving episode of spin-off Call Oxbridge 2000.

Main cast 
 Jill Browne as Nurse Carole Young, staff nurse
 Rosemary Miller as Nurse Pat Roberts, staff nurse
 Charles Tingwell as Doctor Alan Dawson, senior house officer
 Frederick Bartman as Doctor Simon Forrester, senior house officer
 Pamela Duncan as Sister Doughty, charge sister
 Desmond Carrington as Doctor Chris Anderson, consultant in emergency medicine
 John Carlisle as Mr Lester Large, consultant general surgeon
 Peter Howell as Doctor Peter Harrison, pre-registration house officer
 Anne Lloyd as Nurse Pat Roberts, staff nurse
 Glyn Owen as Doctor Patrick O'Meara, medical registrar in cardiology
 Tricia Money as Nurse Michaela Davies, senior staff nurse
 John White as Doctor Giles Farmer
 Paula Byrne as Nurse Frances Whitney, state enrolled nurse
 Kerry Marsh as Nurse O'Keefe, student nurse
 Richard Thorp as Doctor John Rennie, consultant in emergency medicine
 Barbara Clegg as Nurse Jo Buckley, staff nurse
 Iris Russell as Matron Mary Stevenson, senior ward sister/Hospital matron
 Pik-Sen Lim as Nurse Kwei-Kim Yen, staff nurse
 Dorothy Smith as Sister McNab
 John Barron as Harold de la Roux, hospital trustee
 Kathleen Byron as Margaret de la Roux, hospital trustee
 Therese McMurray as Nurse Maureen Parkin, staff nurse
William Wilde as Doctor Brooke, locum medical registrar in general surgery
 Jane Rossington as Nurse Katherine Ford, senior consultant nurse in general surgery
 Joan Matheson as Sister Rhys

See also 
 Emergency – Ward 9, contemporary television play by Dennis Potter

References

External links 
 
 

1957 British television series debuts
1967 British television series endings
1950s British television soap operas
1960s British television soap operas
ITV soap operas
Television series by ITV Studios
British television soap operas
British medical television series
English-language television shows
Television shows produced by Associated Television (ATV)
Black-and-white British television shows
Television shows shot at ATV Elstree Studios